"Think of Me" is a song written by Leon Berger and recorded by the Australian/New Zealand band Koo De Tah. It was released in September 1986 as the third single from the band's debut studio album, Koo De Tah. The peaked at number 69 on the Australian Kent Music Report.

Track listing
 7" Single (884 816-7)
 Side A "Think of Me" - 3:58
 Side B "Love 'Em Never" - 3:52

 12" Single (884 816-1)
 Side A "Think of Me"  (Mal Luka remix)  - 5:20
 Side B "Love 'Em Never" - 3:52

Charts

References 

1986 songs
1986 singles
PolyGram singles
Songs written by Leon Berger